Emile André Jean De Mot (20 October 1835 – 23 November 1909) was a Belgian liberal politician and burgomaster of Brussels.

He was a lawyer and became alderman and burgomaster of Brussels (1899–1909). He was also a member of parliament.

See also
 List of mayors of the City of Brussels

References

Sources
 Emile Jean André DE MOT – Familiekunde Brussel

1835 births
1909 deaths
Mayors of the City of Brussels